Millay Arts, formerly the Millay Colony for the Arts, is an arts community offering residency-retreats and workshops in Austerlitz, New York, and free arts programs in local public schools. Housed on the former property of feminist/activist poet and playwright Edna St. Vincent Millay, the Colony's campus offers residencies, retreats, and classes.

History
 In 1925, Edna St. Vincent Millay bought Steepletop, a house with a blueberry farm in Austerlitz, NY, named after a pink, conical wildflower that grows there. With her husband, Millay built a barn from a Sears Roebuck kit, and then a writing cabin, and a tennis court.

After the poet's death in 1950, her sister Norma Millay Ellis moved to Steepletop. In 1973, she founded The Millay Colony, which was established as a nonprofit organization. Norma Millay Ellis donated the barn and surrounding acreage to The Millay Colony. The barn was subsequently renovated to provide accommodations and studio space for four resident artists.

In the mid-1990s, The Millay Colony commissioned architectural firm Michael Singer Studio, in consultation with an advisory committee of six artists with disabilities, to design an additional building for the Colony using the principles of universal access and environmentally friendly design.

This 3,550 square foot building currently houses The Millay Colony's offices and public rooms, and provides accommodations and studio space.

The house and gardens are a National Historic Landmark.

Notable residents

Composing
Linda Bouchard
Andrea Clearfield
Michael Harrison
Laura Kaminsky
Zibuokle Martinaityte
Alex Weiser

Fiction
Zaki Baydoun
Teresa Carmody
Andrew Sean Greer
Eugenia Kim (author)
Paul Lisicky
Carmen Maria Machado
Sigrid Nunez
Alice Sebold
David Shields
Masha Tupitsyn
Rebecca Wolff

Non-fiction
Nancy Milford
Judith E. Stein

Playwriting
Annie Baker
Jennifer Haley
Jen Silverman
Fiona Templeton

Poetry
Nick Flynn
Rachel Eliza Griffiths
Nathan Hoks
Stephen Motika
Lia Purpura
Evie Shockley
Danez Smith

Screenwriting
Adam Baran

Visual arts
Louise Belcourt
Isa Leshko
Julia Dault
B.A. Van Sise
Wlodzimierz Ksiazek

Footnotes

References
 "Millay Farm Becoming an Arts Colony," The New York Times, February 20, 1974.
 "Norma Millay Ellis, 92; Arts Colony Founder," The New York Times, May 16, 1986.
 "An Artists' Retreat Is Extending Its Welcome," The New York Times, October 3, 1996.
 Millay Colony for the Arts, about, tour. June 30, 2008. 
 Where Big Books Are Born: Danez Smith on the Millay Colony," Poets & Writers, March/April, 2018.

External links

 Website
 Michael Singer Studio, architects

Artist colonies
Non-profit organizations based in New York (state)
Arts organizations based in New York (state)
Arts organizations established in 1973
1973 establishments in New York (state)